Kritnaphop Mekpatcharakul (born 26 August 1983), simply known as Porn, is a Thai professional footballer who plays as a defender.

External links
 Profile at Goal
 

1983 births
Living people
Kritnaphop Mekpatcharakul
Association football defenders
Kritnaphop Mekpatcharakul
Kritnaphop Mekpatcharakul
Kritnaphop Mekpatcharakul
Kritnaphop Mekpatcharakul